Gundughdi (also Romanized as Gūndūghdī and Goondooghdi; also known as Gūndoghdī and Kandugada) is a village in Garmeh-ye Jonubi Rural District of the Central District of Mianeh County, East Azerbaijan province, Iran. At the 2006 National Census, its population was 1,356 in 292 households. The following census in 2011 counted 1,227 people in 356 households. The latest census in 2016 showed a population of 1,024 people in 304 households; it was the largest village in its rural district.

References 

Meyaneh County

Populated places in East Azerbaijan Province

Populated places in Meyaneh County